The Office of the Small Business Commissioner (OSBC) was established by the UK government in Part 1 of the Enterprise Act, 2016. Secretary of State for Business Greg Clark announced the appointment of Paul Uppal to the newly established post of Small Business Commissioner on 2 October 2017. On 20 December 2017, working with digital agency "dxw digital", an advice and complaints service was launched to help small businesses get paid on time and ensure fair payment practices.

The role of the OSBC is to provide general information and advice to small businesses about payment issues with larger businesses, and direct them to services to help them resolve their payment issues. The Commissioner also offers a complaint service. Supporting the Britain's 5.5 million small businesses is a priority outlined in the UK government’s Industrial Strategy. The Office works across the whole of the UK.

Background 
The Small Business Commissioner was established as a non-departmental public body by the Department for Business, Energy and Industrial Strategy. It was announced in a discussion paper issued in July 2015 and was formally proposed for creation within the Enterprise Bill introduced into the UK Parliament in September 2015.

Anna Soubry MP, the Minister of State for Small Business, Industry and Enterprise within the Department for Business, Energy and Industrial Strategy, anticipated that the Small Business Commissioner would 'build the confidence and capabilities of small businesses to help them assert themselves in contractual disputes and negotiate more effectively'.

Under the legislation, the Commissioner:
enables small businesses to resolve disputes and avoid future issues through general advice and information
signposts businesses to appropriate services e.g. sector ombudsmen or regulators, existing independent advice services, approved alternative dispute resolution (ADR) providers or the Commissioner's own complaints handling function
considers complaints by small business suppliers about payment issues with larger businesses that they supply

A proposal to give the commissioner a role in direct mediation between businesses was not pursued as the government did not believe there was sufficient evidence of market failure in relation to mediation services.

Prior to its launch, the Federation of Small Businesses (FSB) described the proposal as 'a step in the right direction'. The Office works with the FSB, Confederation of British Industry and British Chambers of Commerce to promote timely payment of commercial debts.

Commissioner
On 1 Juny 2021 Liz Barclay, a broadcaster and former consumer advisor replaced interim Commissioner Philip King as the Commissioner.

References

Small business
Non-departmental public bodies of the United Kingdom government
Department for Business, Energy and Industrial Strategy